Viscount Rothermere, of Hemsted in the county of Kent, is a title in the Peerage of the United Kingdom. It was created in 1919 for the press lord Harold Harmsworth, 1st Baron Harmsworth. He had already been created a baronet, of Horsey in the County of Norfolk, on 14 July 1910, and Baron Rothermere, of Hemsted in the County of Kent, in 1914. Every holder of the titles has served as chairman of Daily Mail and General Trust plc.  the titles are held by the first Viscount's great-grandson, the fourth Viscount, who succeeded his father in 1998.

The first Viscount Rothermere was the younger brother of Alfred Harmsworth, 1st Viscount Northcliffe, and the elder brother of Cecil Harmsworth, 1st Baron Harmsworth, Sir Leicester Harmsworth, 1st Baronet, and Sir Hildebrand Harmsworth, 1st Baronet.

The family seat is Ferne House, near Donhead St Andrew, Wiltshire.

Viscounts Rothermere (1919)
Harold Sydney Harmsworth, 1st Viscount Rothermere (1868–1940)
Hon. Harold Alfred Vyvyan St George Harmsworth (1894–1918) 
Esmond Cecil Harmsworth, 2nd Viscount Rothermere (1898–1978)
Vere Harold Esmond Harmsworth, 3rd Viscount Rothermere (1925–1998)
(Harold) Jonathan Esmond Vere Harmsworth, 4th Viscount Rothermere (born 1967)

The heir apparent is the present holder's son, the Hon. Vere Richard Jonathan Harold Harmsworth (born 1994).

Line of succession

 Harold Sydney Harmsworth, 1st Viscount Rothermere (1868–1940)
 Esmond Cecil Harmsworth, 2nd Viscount Rothermere (1898–1978)
 Vere Harold Esmond Harmsworth, 3rd Viscount Rothermere (1925–1998)
 (Harold) Jonathan Esmond Vere Harmsworth, 4th Viscount Rothermere (b. 1967)
(1) Hon. Vere Richard Jonathan Harold Harmsworth (b. 1994)
(2) Hon. Alfred Northcliffe St. John Harmsworth (b. 2010)
(3) Hon. (Esmond) Vyvyan Harmsworth (b. 1967)

See also
Viscount Northcliffe
Baron Harmsworth
Harmsworth baronets, of Moray Lodge, and Harmsworth baronets, of Freshwater Grove
Rothermere American Institute at University of Oxford

References

General
Kidd, Charles, Williamson, David (editors). Debrett's Peerage and Baronetage (1990 edition). New York: St Martin's Press, 1990.

Viscountcies in the Peerage of the United Kingdom
Viscount
Noble titles created in 1919